Ivo Karlović was the defending champion, and won in the final 7–5, 6–7(4–7), 7–6(10–8), against Fernando Verdasco.

Seeds

Draw

Finals

Top half

Bottom half

External links
 Main draw
 Qualifying draw

Singles